2'-O-methylation is a common nucleoside modification of RNA, where a methyl group is added to the 2' hydroxyl of the ribose moiety of a nucleoside, producing a methoxy group. 2'-O-methylated nucleosides are mostly found in ribosomal RNA and small nuclear RNA and occur in the functionally essential regions of the ribosome and spliceosome. Currently, about 1210 2'-O-methylations (2'-O-Me) have been identified in mammals and yeast and deposited in RMBase (RNA Modification Base) database.

Having chemical properties intermediate between RNA and DNA, 2'-O-methylation is presumed to have been one of the reactive group of RNA molecules on early earth that would have given rise to DNA.

A method to map 2'-O ribose methylations by high throughput sequencing has been published. The method maps modifications of rRNAs in a single experiment.

See also
 Nucleic acid analogue
 Small nucleolar RNA

References

RNA
O-methylation